Cristian Venancio Bogado Morínigo (born 7 January 1987) is a Paraguayan footballer who plays as a striker.

International goals

Honours

Club
Colo-Colo
 Primera División de Chile (1): 2009 Clausura

External links
 
 Argentine Primera statistics at Fútbol XXI  
 

1987 births
Living people
Paraguayan footballers
Paraguay international footballers
Paraguay under-20 international footballers
Paraguayan expatriate footballers
Club Sol de América footballers
Club Libertad footballers
Club Nacional footballers
Club Olimpia footballers
Unión Comercio footballers
Estudiantes de La Plata footballers
Deportes Iquique footballers
Colo-Colo footballers
Club Rubio Ñu footballers
Audax Italiano footballers
Paraguayan Primera División players
Chilean Primera División players
Argentine Primera División players
Expatriate footballers in Argentina
Expatriate footballers in Chile
Expatriate footballers in Peru
Association football forwards